Maurice Gustave Benoît Choisy (29 June 1897 – 19 June 1966) was a French mycologist and lichenologist. He was president of the botanical section of the latter society from 1949 to 1950.

Species named after Choisy include Dermatocarpon choisyi ; Haematomma choisyi ; and Lecidea choisyi .

Selected publications

See also
 :Category:Taxa named by Maurice Choisy

References

1897 births
1966 deaths
French mycologists
French lichenologists
20th-century French scientists